The Chinese orangutan (Pongo weidenreichi) is an extinct species of orangutan from the Early Pleistocene of South China. It is known from fossil teeth found in the Sanhe Cave, and Baikong, Juyuan and Queque Caves in Chongzuo, Guangxi. Dental dimensions of that species is 20% bigger than those of living orangutans.

References 

Pleistocene primates
Prehistoric apes
Pleistocene mammals of Asia
Orangutans